Enes is a genus of beetles in the family Cerambycidae, containing the following species:

 Enes alboguttatus Breuning, 1957
 Enes aruensis Breuning, 1959
 Enes bakeri Fisher, 1925
 Enes enganensis Breuning, 1956
 Enes familiaris Pascoe, 1864
 Enes intinctus Pascoe, 1864
 Enes irritans Pascoe, 1864
 Enes juvencus Pascoe, 1864
 Enes luzonicus Fisher, 1925
 Enes marmoratus Fisher, 1925
 Enes obliquus Pascoe, 1864
 Enes pallidus Fisher, 1925
 Enes porcellus Pascoe, 1864
 Enes pulicaris Pascoe, 1864
 Enes scutellaris Fisher, 1925
 Enes setiger Fisher, 1925
 Enes sibuyanus Fisher, 1925
 Enes spinosus Fisher, 1925

References

Acanthocinini